Brigadier Jeffrey Robson Cook,  (born 1954) is a retired British Army officer and a former Director for Security Liaison in the Royal Household of the Sovereign of the United Kingdom. He served in the Royal Household from 2004 to 2009, and is now Managing Director of the Morgan Aquila Group.

Early life and military career
Cook was born in 1954. He entered the Royal Military Academy Sandhurst and, on graduation, was granted a short service commission as a second lieutenant in the Staffordshire Regiment on 9 November 1974. Promoted lieutenant on 9 November 1976 and captain on 2 December 1983, Cook trained as a parachutist and saw service in Northern Ireland during the Troubles and in the Balkans and elsewhere as an officer of the Special Air Service. He was granted a regular commission in 1984, and awarded the Military Cross in April 1985 "in recognition of gallant and distinguished service in Northern Ireland".

Promoted major on 30 September 1987, Cook was appointed a Member of the Order of the British Empire in April 1988 in recognition of further "distinguished service" in Northern Ireland. He transferred from the Staffordshire Regiment to the Devonshire and Dorset Regiment on 4 September 1990. Cook was promoted lieutenant colonel on 30 June 1994, and advanced to Officer of the Order of the British Empire in 1995 for his services in Northern Ireland between 1 October 1994 and 31 March 1995. He subsequently took part in NATO operations in Bosnia and Herzegovina in 1995 and was awarded a Queen's Commendation for Valuable Service. Promoted colonel on 30 June 1998 and brigadier on 31 December 1999 (with seniority from 30 June), Cook commanded the 20th Armoured Infantry Brigade from 1999 to 2001. He retired from the British Army on 1 June 2004.

Director for Security Liaison
Following his retirement from the army, Cook was appointed the inaugural Director for Security Liaison. The position was a new addition to the Private Secretary's Office in the Royal Household of the Sovereign of the United Kingdom. The Private Secretary has general oversight of security, though the Master of the Household is also involved, and the Keeper of the Privy Purse has responsibility for the ceremonial bodyguards.

References

External links
 BBC report

1954 births
British military personnel of The Troubles (Northern Ireland)
Devonshire and Dorset Regiment officers
Graduates of the Royal Military Academy Sandhurst
Living people
NATO personnel in the Bosnian War
Recipients of the Commendation for Valuable Service
Recipients of the Military Cross
Special Air Service officers
British Army brigadiers
Staffordshire Regiment officers